Bismark Township, Nebraska may refer to the following places in Nebraska, United States:

Bismark Township, Cuming County, Nebraska
Bismark Township, Platte County, Nebraska

See also
Bismarck Township (disambiguation)
Bismarck, Nebraska, an unincorporated community in Cuming County, Nebraska

Nebraska township disambiguation pages